The Sharpner's Pond Anti-Ballistic Missile Site is a location in North Andover, Massachusetts which was designed to be the site of a Perimeter Acquisition Radar for the Sentinel program. Before construction began, local residents shot down the proposition and the project was never completed. The original design was to consist of the excavation for the radar and an underground power plant. The area that was quarried became part of the Boxford State Forest and has become a pond.

Recent Incidents 
Sharpner's Pond is not designated for swimming and there is a posted "No Swimming" sign at its entrance. This sign is often ignored and has become obstructed and defaced. Between 2004 and 2008, three fatalities resulted from swimming incidents in the deep, murky water.

References

External links
Site history
A History of the Huntsville Division U.S. Army Corps of Engineers

North Andover, Massachusetts
Missile defense